Robert Hutchinson, OBE FSA, is a British historian from Arundel.

Hutchinson is specialized in the history of the Reformation, especially church archeology. He is a Fellow of the Society of Antiquaries of London (FSA). Hutchinson earned a PhD degree in 2010.

Works
The Last Days of Henry VIII: Conspiracy, Treason and Heresy at the Court of the dying Tyrant (2005) 
Elizabeth's Spy Master: Francis Walsingham and the Secret War that saved England (2006)
Thomas Cromwell: The Rise and Fall of Henry VIII's most Notorious Minister (2007)
House of Treason: The Rise and Fall of a Tudor Dynasty (2009)
Young Henry: The Rise of Henry VIII (2011)
The Spanish Armada (2013)
Henry VIII: The Decline and Fall of a Tyrant (2020)

References

Fellows of the Society of Antiquaries of London
Living people
Officers of the Order of the British Empire
Place of birth missing (living people)
Year of birth missing (living people)